Sadiq Muhammad Khan IV; also spelled Sadeq or Sadik; was the 10th Nawab of Bahawalpur who ruled the Bahawalpur State from 1879 to 1899 under the supervision of British Raj. He died in 1899 and was succeeded by his eldest son Bahawal Khan V.

Biography
Sadiq Muhammad Khan Bahadur was born in 1862. He became Nawab of Bahawalpur on 25 March 1866, after the death of his father Mohammad bahawal khan. As he was still a minor, the British temporarily administered the region. He was invested with full ruling powers at Derawar Fort on 28 November 1879. During his governance, he ordered for construction of many buildings in Bahawalpur including Daulat Khana, Sadiq Garh Palace, Noor Mahal and Gulzar Mahal.

References

People from Bahawalpur
1861 births
1899 deaths
Nawabs of Bahawalpur (princely state)
Princely rulers of Pakistan
Nawabs of Pakistan